Betty Nambooze Bakireke, commonly known as Betty Nambooze, is a Ugandan journalist and politician. She serves as the Member of Parliament, representing Mukono Municipality, in Mukono District

Background and education
She was born in Mukono District, on 13 July 1969. She attended Bishop's Senior Secondary School Mukono, graduating in 1986. She later attended the Law Development Centre, graduating with a Diploma in Law, in 1998. In 2010, she was awarded the Diploma in Development Studies by Uganda Martyrs University.

Work experience
Nambooze was first elected to parliament in May 2010, when in a by-election, running on the Democratic Party ticket, she defeated the then incumbent MP, Peter Bakaluba Mukasa of the ruling National Resistance Movement. According to her parliamentary profile, Nambooze worked as a news reporter (stringer), between 1993 and 2000. From 2000 until 2004, she worked as a law enforcement officer. From 2004 until 2005, she served as a personnel officer. She worked as a radio presenter between 2000 and 2009 at CBS FM. From 2005 until 2010, she served as the Spokesperson for the Democratic Party in Uganda.

On 24 February 2016, she was briefly arrested along with MP-elect Moses Kasibante for revealing documents describing election fraud taking place during the country's recent election.

Nambooze has been arrested on numerous occasions on various politically-motivated, often trumped-up charges, but she has not as of yet been convicted in any court of law. her life has also been threatened and even poisoned because of her political activities.

On 13 August 2020, Nambooze was declared a member of "National Unity Platform" political party joining forces with his fellow member of parliament "Kyagulanyi Sentamu Robert" a.k.a. "Bobi Wine" the party president . Together with her other party members, Nambooze are set on "Mission 2021" a party mission to unseat the ruling party in the upcoming the 2021 elections 

In the 2021 parliamentary elections, Namboze won another term of office (2021-2026) to represent mukono municipality  on the NUP ticket after defeating her closest competitors Mr George Fred Kagimu of Democratic Party (DP) and Abbas Ssozi of National resistance Movement (NRM). On 19th October police probed attack on honorable Betty Nambooze's home where they recovered two brad new pangas in a sack in a small garden of tomatoes

Parliamentary duties
Nambooze sits on the (a) Committee on Public Service and Local Government and the (b) Committee on Local Government Accounts.

Personal
In November 2002, Betty Nambooze married Henry Bakireke, whom she had met in high school in the 1980s. Together, they are the parents of over 26 children, both natural and adopted.

See also
 Parliament of Uganda

References

External links
Website of the Parliament of Uganda
Betty Nambooze Triumphs in Mukono North MP Elections

1969 births
Living people
Uganda Martyrs University alumni
Law Development Centre alumni
Members of the Parliament of Uganda
Ganda people
People from Mukono District
People from Central Region, Uganda
21st-century Ugandan women politicians
21st-century Ugandan politicians
Ugandan journalists
Ugandan women journalists
Democratic Party (Uganda) politicians
Women members of the Parliament of Uganda